Huang Meigui (pronounced ) is a relatively new Wuyi oolong tea, developed c. 2002. It has a highly aromatic fragrance and a lighter floral taste than most other Wuyi oolongs.

The colour of the steeped leaves is a very light green, much greener than other Wuyi teas.

References
 Huang Mei Gui at Babelcarp
 In Chinese and translated

Wuyi tea
Oolong tea
Chinese teas
Chinese tea grown in Fujian
Food and drink introduced in 2002
Cultivars of tea grown in China